This is a summary of notable incidents that have taken place at amusement parks, water parks, or theme parks that are currently owned or operated by Cedar Fair.  This list is not intended to be a comprehensive list of every such event, but only those that had a significant impact on the parks or park operations, or are otherwise significantly newsworthy. The term incidents refers to major accidents, injuries, or deaths that occur at a park. These incidents were required to be reported to regulatory authorities due to where they occurred. They usually fall into one of the following categories:

 Negligence on the part of the guest, such as refusal to follow specific ride safety instructions.
 A guest deliberately breaking park rules.
 A guest's known, or unknown, health issues.
 Negligence on the part of the park, either by a ride operator or maintenance staff.
 Negligence on the part of the attraction's manufacturer (e.g., faulty design)
 An Act of God or a generic accident (e.g., slipping and falling) that is not a direct result of an action or inaction on anybody's part.

(*) means the ride or attraction is no longer operating.

California's Great America

On July 4, 2019, police were called near the entrance of the park where a woman was shot during the evening of the fireworks show. The victim was struck on the arm by a handgun. She did not suffer any serious injuries and was also treated at the scene. It was ruled as an altercation between two family groups.

Breakers Bay
 On July 12, 2007, a 4-year-old boy drowned in a two-foot deep area of the wave pool. Lifeguards and EMTs tried to resuscitate him, but he was pronounced dead at Kaiser Hospital.

Demon
On August 12, 1976, the wheel assembly guide from a roller coaster train on Demon broke loose and fell to the ground, causing the ride to automatically stop while on its tracks. There were a total of 24 passengers on board the ride and none of them were seriously injured. A park spokesperson claimed that it happened a few seconds after the train went through the double corkscrews before stopping at its brake run. At that time the ride was known as Turn of the Century.

Drop Tower
 On August 22, 1999, a 12-year-old boy fell from the Drop Tower and died. His family claimed the shoulder harnesses were not locked properly. An investigation was inconclusive and no charges were filed.

Flight Deck
 On September 7, 1998, a 25-year-old Spanish-speaking man was struck by the dangling leg of a 28-year-old woman riding Flight Deck. There were allegedly issues with his ability to understand the park's English warning signs, and he entered the ride's restricted area to retrieve his hat. He was pronounced dead an hour later at Valley Medical Center. The woman riding suffered a broken leg.
 On June 12, 2015, a maintenance worker was critically injured after being struck in the head by a moving train on Flight Deck. A passenger sustained serious hand and leg injuries in the incident.

Halloween Haunt*
On October 28, 2017, police reported that there were multiple witnesses where 20 teenage boys were assaulting and robbing park visitors. One person was arrested while others suffered minor injuries and some were taken to the hospital.
On October 26, 2019, a group of teenagers sparked some firecrackers in the front gate causing guests to scramble, thinking it was a shooting. It was later determined to be due to a robbery. Concession stands within the park were also robbed by fleeing guests.

Invertigo*
On August 10, 2009, 24 passengers on Invertigo were stuck on the ride  up its lift hill after it malfunctioned. It took firefighters more than four hours to safely evacuate passengers down the staircase. No injuries were reported.

Logger's Run*
 On July 4, 1989, two boys intentionally jumped out of the ride. One 9-year-old died and the other fell safely onto an emergency platform.

Rip Roaring Rapids
In 1996, six people were injured when a raft on the Rip Roaring Rapids overturned.
In 2005, a female park patron suffered broken ribs in an impact with the side of a seat when the raft came to a sudden stop.

Rue Le Dodge
In July 2005, a woman fractured her wrist while she was on one of the bumper cars accompanied by her son.

Whizzer*
 On March 29, 1980, a 13-year-old boy riding Whizzer was killed and eight other passengers were injured when two trains collided. The U.S. Consumer Product Safety Commission charged the park with not reporting a possible defect in the ride's braking system. Marriott Corporation settled the civil penalty action brought by the U.S. Consumer Product Safety Commission with a US$70,000 payment. The Commission found that eleven other incidents happened on the ride between 1976 and 1979, resulting in an unknown number of injuries.

Yankee Clipper*
In 1991, two people sustained injuries as they were trapped upside down in their boat after it hydroplaned and overturned in the water. Following this incident the ride was modified to include a bump at the bottom of its splashdown to prevent the boats from colliding.

Canada's Wonderland

 On May 11, 2003, two guests were involved in a fight over $10 worth of marijuana at the front gate of the park, which led to a shooting death. Metal detectors were added at the front gate, along with the implementation of bag checks for additional security following the incident.
 On October 26, 2014, two people were stabbed in the parking lot after the amusement park had closed. One of the victims, a 21-year-old man, was pronounced dead at the scene. The other victim, an 18-year-old man, was taken to an area hospital with "life-threatening injuries" but was later released. Police arrested and charged an 18-year-old man in connection with the attack several weeks later. They believed the attack was part of a confrontation between two groups that began inside the park and escalated in the parking lot.

Lumberjack
 On July 18, 2021, riders on Lumberjack were stranded upside down for 5 minutes due to a possible control malfunction. Nobody was injured. The ride reopened at 1:40PM the same day.

Splash Works
 On July 31, 2022, a small fire broke out at Splash Works shortly after a fireworks display destroying a section of the ‘Super Soaker’ water slide and a pump-house below it. Nobody was injured, but the water park remained closed the next day following the incident. It reopened 1 day later on August 2 with limited operations.

The Bat
 On July 20, 2004, twenty people were stranded on the coaster due to a malfunction.

Victoria Falls
 In 1988, an 18-year-old diver drowned in the pond below the waterfall of Victoria Falls. After swimming for 10 minutes, he approached the falls to retrieve a frisbee. His brother attempted to help but was pulled underwater several times. Resuscitation efforts by park staff failed. Wonderland's Director of Engineering denied the pond had an undertow, but the incident was later blamed on a whirlpool effect created by the waterfall.

Carowinds

 On June 9, 2016, a transformer exploded nearby, causing a park-wide power outage. Riders were stranded on various rides, including 17 on WindSeeker and an unspecified number on Intimidator and Fury 325. Some guests waited over an hour before being evacuated. No injuries were reported, and the park reopened the following day in limited capacity.
 On September 5, 2016, around the time the park was closing, police were notified that a 22-year-old man allegedly shot a 14-year-old boy in the bus parking lot. It was reported that the altercation began as an argument inside the park before escalating outside. The man was arrested by police, and the boy was rushed to a nearby hospital to treat life-threatening injuries.

Carolina Harbor
On June 7, 1987, five people were arrested for allegedly shooting two people inside Carolina Harbor with an unregistered machine gun. A 16-year-old girl playing in the wave pool was killed after being shot in the back by a large caliber bullet, which exited her chest. The other victim was a 6-year-old girl who was shot in the abdomen but survived after five days of hospitalization.
On July 5, 1989, an 11-year-old boy drowned in the wave pool. Lifeguards pulled the unresponsive victim out of the water and unsuccessfully tried to resuscitate him. He was pronounced dead at Charlotte Memorial Hospital.

Copperhead Strike
On August 18, 2019, a guest was taken to the hospital after injuring his hand while riding Copperhead Strike. The ride was shut down temporarily for investigation.

Drop Tower
On May 17, 1996, one of the cars on Drop Tower failed to ascend to the top of the tower after the safety control system locked the brakes. Park maintenance was unable to manually release the braking system. Three riders were stranded  in the air for nearly three hours before being rescued.

Hover & Dodge
On June 4, 2018, a bumper car on the ride caught fire but was quickly extinguished by the ride attendant. There were no injuries. The ride passed inspection and resumed normal operation.

Mountain Gliders
On July 11, 2021, an empty stroller remained in the ride's surrounding area as it got caught between one of the seats once the ride started moving and was dragged spinning through the air until eventually being thrown off. The attendant maintaining the ride quickly pressed the emergency stop button once the issue was addressed and all passengers were safely evacuated from the attraction. There were no injuries and the ride continued to safely operate throughout that same day.

Nighthawk
 On March 17, 2007, seven park employees sustained minor injuries during a test run of BORG Assimilator (later renamed Nighthawk) when the seats changed position during the ride. The ride operator accidentally pressed a button releasing the seat locking pins after the train departed, which were responsible for keeping the seats in a fixed position. The ride was later modified to disable the button while trains are in motion.

Rip Roarin' Rapids*
On May 8, 1982, eight people were injured when two boats jammed up, resulting in a collision with other boats moving down the ride. One was knocked over by a guardrail. All were treated for minor injuries.

Thunder Road*
On July 25, 1979, a malfunction brought a coaster train on Thunder Road to a sudden halt when the wheels became slightly dislodged. A total of 27 passengers were lowered to the ground by a lift from the back of a truck. The coaster's track was damaged, but there were no injuries reported. A park spokesperson later referred to the incident as a "freak occurrence".
 On April 5, 1999, a roller coaster train failed to stop on the final brake run, leading to a collision with another train parked at the station. Seven of the 16 passengers involved were taken to a local hospital and treated for minor injuries.

WhiteWater Falls*
On September 16, 1987, during construction for the new water ride, a sewage pipe collapsed off its supports which trapped and killed a 49-year-old male construction worker underneath 2 feet of dirt inside a 10-foot trench for almost 25 minutes before his body was recovered. An autopsy conducted by the York County Coroner's Office revealed that the victim's pulse had stopped once his body was found, then he was pronounced dead due to suffocation.

WindSeeker 
 On July 28, 2013, 65 passengers were stuck on Carowinds' WindSeeker for over an hour, when a safety mechanism halted the ride.
 On April 11, 2015, a safety mechanism halted the ride, stranding 60 passengers  in the air for approximately 15 minutes.
 On March 6, 2019, a third-party contractor critically injured a hand while inspecting the WindSeeker at Carowinds prior to its seasonal opening. He was treated at a nearby hospital.

Cedar Point

On May 28, 2018, Cedar Point suffered a park-wide power failure, caused by a car hitting a nearby utility pole outside the park. Guests were stranded on multiple rides including Millennium Force in 90-degree heat, and it took up to two hours for power to be fully restored. No injuries were reported.

Cedar Creek Mine Ride
 On May 24, 1984, a 5-year-old boy riding Cedar Creek Mine Ride suffered a fractured skull and bruises after falling from the train's front seat during its  drop. The ride had a 48-inch height restriction when it opened in 1969, but this was later relaxed to 48 inches or accompanied by a parent, so the boy may have been too small to ride. The park reinstated the original 48 inch height restriction and added thicker lap bars after the incident.
 On July 30, 1988, injuries were reported after an empty train was released from the station and collided with a train full of passengers stuck on the coaster's second lift hill. Twelve people filed lawsuits against the park, eight of them passengers and four of them parents. On February 5, 1991, one of the plaintiffs was awarded $35,000 after the jury deliberated for about four hours. The victim suffered nerve, knee and back injuries.

Corkscrew
On August 25, 1981, two people were injured on Corkscrew when one of the cars on a train suddenly disengaged.
On August 29, 1999, during the time of its operation, the chain lift used on the ride broke with riders being stranded on one of the coaster's cars. Although none of them that were on board were seriously injured in the accident, four were taken to the park's first aid station as a precaution.

Disaster Transport*
On June 7, 1990, three people suffered injuries while riding Disaster Transport when a prop fell from the tracks onto them.

GateKeeper
 On July 13, 2013, a man riding GateKeeper was found unresponsive when one of the trains returned to the station. He was given CPR on-scene by Cedar Point police officers, then hospitalized at Firelands Regional Medical Center. A park spokesman said the man survived a medical condition unrelated to the ride, which reopened about six hours later after passing a mechanical inspection.
 On June 12, 2019, a strong gust of wind caused a train to stall and fail to return to the station. Safety mechanisms engaged, stopping the next train on the lift hill. All riders on both trains were evacuated safely.
  On June 12, 2021, one of the trains got stuck on the lift hill due to a broken chain.

Gemini
On June 22, 1986, four people riding Gemini suffered injuries and were taken to a nearby hospital when two trains collided.

Magnum XL-200
 On May 26, 2007, a train moving at  hit a parked train, causing minor damage to both and injuring at least three passengers. Two were treated on scene, and a third, who had an asthma attack, was taken to a local hospital. The ride returned to single-train service the next day. The park said the accident was caused by wet tracks from early morning condensation.

Mean Streak*
 On August 1, 1992, a 20-year-old man injured one of his hands when it was caught between the coaster train and loading platform as the ride was ending its run. He was taken to a nearby hospital where he underwent surgery for lacerations on his right wrist. The ride was temporarily shut down and reopened after inspections verified the coaster was operating properly.

Millennium Force
There were no injuries, but the incident made headlines, and the ride was temporarily closed for a week.

Raptor
On July 6, 2009, a teenager complained of feeling faint after riding Raptor, shutting down the coaster for inspection. The teenager was taken to a nearby hospital and later released. The ride reopened the following afternoon.
On June 21, 2015, a 37-year-old man injured his right leg when the gates in the ride's loading platform closed on him as he was boarding the ride.
On August 13, 2015, a 45-year-old man attempting to retrieve a dropped cell phone in the ride's restricted area was killed after being struck in the back of the head by a passing roller coaster train. Park emergency crews attempted to revive the man, but he was eventually pronounced dead on scene. The ride was temporarily closed for inspection and reopened the following day.

Scamper*
On June 29, 1963, a 17-year-old boy suffered fractures to his wrists while riding the coaster. He was treated at Good Samaritan Hospital.

Shoot the Rapids*
 On July 19, 2013, a boat on Shoot the Rapids rolled back down the ride's lift hill and flipped over, injuring seven and allegedly stranding them under water for several minutes before park employees could rescue them. Six were treated by park medical staff, and one was taken to a nearby hospital and later released. The ride was closed for the remainder of the 2013 season and reopened in 2014.

Skyhawk
 On July 26, 2014, a cable on Skyhawk for one of the carriages that attaches to the pendulum snapped, injuring two riders. One was treated on scene, while the other was taken to a local hospital and later released. Skyhawk reopened on August 1, 2014.

Snake River Falls
 On July 3, 2013, a boat on Snake River Falls failed to generate a splash at the bottom of its descent, causing it to become dislodged at the track's first turn. Cedar Point later determined that the water level was too low. No injuries were reported.

Space Spiral*
 On May 18, 1985, ten people were stranded on Space Spiral for several hours inside its cab. The device responsible for raising and lowering the cab had partially failed, preventing the cab from returning to ground level. It had to be raised to the top of the tower, with its passengers being evacuated either by ladder or winch and harness.

Steel Vengeance
 On May 5, 2018, opening day for the 2018 season, a train on Steel Vengeance returning to the station lightly bumped into another train that was parked in the station. Four riders were examined by the park's first aid team and released. The ride reopened later that day with only one train in operation. Normal operation resumed the following month.
 On July 21, 2018, a 17-year-old boy threw a packet of hot sauce at a train. Seven people were treated at the park. The boy was arrested and charged with disorderly conduct.
On August 11, 2018, a tire from the drive system, located near the brake run, became detached and landed near the queue. The ride was evacuated and reopened later the same evening with no injuries reported.

Top Thrill Dragster*
 On July 14, 2004, four people riding Top Thrill Dragster were struck by metal debris that sheared off the coaster's launch cable during launch. They were treated at the park's first aid station, and two sought further treatment at a nearby hospital.
 On August 7, 2016, a launch cable became detached on the ride. Two passengers were evaluated at the park's first aid station and later released, resuming their visit in the park. The ride remained closed through the next business day.
 On August 15, 2021, a guest waiting in line was struck in the head by a piece of metal after it became dislodged from the ride by a passing train that was nearing the end of its run. She was taken to a nearby hospital for treatment and then transferred to an intensive care unit, where it was determined that she had suffered a brain injury. Her full condition has not been released to the public. Following the incident, the ride would remain closed for the remainder of the 2021 season, and would not reopen for the 2022 season. The incident would lead to the ride’s temporary closing. The ride will be reopened for the 2024 Season.

Valravn
 On June 26, 2019, two trains on Valravn suffered a minor collision in the station. Several riders were evaluated by the park's first aid staff, and no injuries were reported. The ride was temporarily closed for two weeks.

VertiGo*
 On January 14, 2002, a  portion of one of VertiGo's  steel towers collapsed. It was later determined to be caused by the removal of the ride vehicle during off-season maintenance. When attached, the vehicle provided stabilization, preventing the towers from swaying past their  sway allowance. On March 11, 2002, the park announced the removal of VertiGo rides from both Cedar Point and Knott's Berry Farm.

White Water Landing*
 On July 20, 2002, two boats on White Water Landing became stuck at the bottom of the drop, and a third boat collided with them from behind. All six riders were examined at hospital for minor injuries and released. The ride reopened the following day after an investigation.

WildCat*
 On May 16, 2008, a car on WildCat rolled backward down the lift hill, colliding with another car. Ten riders suffered minor injuries. Inspections confirmed a suspected fault in the ride's anti-rollback system.
 On June 5, 2011, a car returning to the station collided with a stationary car. Seven riders suffered minor injuries, three of which were evaluated at a nearby hospital.

Sexual Assault at Cedar Point 
Since 2017, Cedar Point has had a total count of 29 reports of sexual assault filed with the Sandusky Police Department. The most recent cases from Cedar Park were reported on May 24, 2022 as well as July 28, 2022. There have been less cases filed for sexual assault this year with only two in comparison to the ten reports from last year. Still, Sandusky Police Department Prosecutor, Kevin Baxter, has stated that the trend of rising sexual assault cases in Cedar Park is alarming and needs to be monitored. The Cedar Park dorms that housed workers is where the alleged sexual assault cases all occurred. Former employees have stated that the environment of living within the employee dorms is very chaotic often feeling like it's a party dormitory. A total number of 15 cases have been dropped by female workers for unknown reasons and only one conviction has occurred; all were coworkers of the accusers. 12 of the cases included rape and 9 included unwanted touching. 21 of the 29 cases have since been closed. As a company Cedar Point has a strict no harassing, threatening, or inappropriate interactions policy for all guests but they haven't been holding their employees up to that same code. On behalf of the victims, WTOL and its affiliates from Columbus and Cleveland have gone forward in suing Cedar Point for the sexual assault cases from the past five years. These tv stations are suing Cedar Point to release their investigations and records because all police departments in the state of Ohio need to make those public record. 

Cedar Point has been asked by numerous news stations for a comment about these sexual assault cases but they've denied all attempts. In a series of emails between the Police Chief for Sandusky PD, Jared Oliver, and the Police Chief for Cedar Point, Ron Gilson, it was shown that Gilson would not be speaking on anything unless it was directed by Cedar Point. In situations as serious as this one, there is a high possibility that whatever information Cedar Point does choose to release would still face a lot of backlash from the general public for how long this has gone on. What Cedar Point has said is that, "While we do not comment on specific personnel matters as we protect the privacy of our associates, we feel it is important to reiterate that every associate who feels unsafe in any way is welcome, without exception, to discuss with management. In no way are any associates discouraged from escalating any situation that may make them feel uncomfortable". Ultimately this plan places a lot of responsibility on individuals to report their uneasy feelings after the situation has happened which can be extremely difficult for victims to do. In attempts to take the responsibility off victims and stop sexual assault before it even happens, Kevin Baxter teamed up with Erie County Victim Assistant Director, Sarah Reynolds, to offer Cedar Point managers and employees education about sexual assault as well as prevention methods. Cedar Point did not take this opportunity and has since made no comments about why. 

Cedar Point has always had their own police department, but because of the rise in reports of sexual assault the amusement park's main company, Cedar Fair, has agreed to team up with the Sandusky Police Department and there is no longer a Cedar Point police department. From now on, all investigations and cases will go through the Sandusky Police Department and Cedar Point will only be in charge of minor responsibilities such as security. Cedar Point will also be responsible for paying the salary, training, and benefits, of the individuals hired through the Sandusky Police Department. 

Numerous employees have come out since working at Cedar Point to discuss what happened to them, why they did or did not report their sexual assault after it happened, and why they believe this happened to them. Former employee Erin McKay says that she was assaulted and raped in 2017 in the Cedar Park employee dorms but feared reporting it because she was 17 years old and not legally allowed to be inside of the Cedar Point employee dormitory. She has since blamed herself for this situation happening. Another former employee by the name of Brittany Dunlap reported that she was fired after reporting that she was sexually assaulted by a co-worker. Even former employees from the 1990s have been coming forward with their stories of sexual assault in the Cedar Point dorms. This woman (who wishes to remain unnamed) recalls back to her time at Cedar Point in 1994 when she reported what happened to her, " They said, 'were you drinking," and I said, 'everybody drinks,' and they said 'well you're underage. Were you drinking? Because if you were drinking you're going to lose your job and your bonus". This employee later quit and realized that she was a few months pregnant with the child of who assaulted her. The former Cedar Point employees who have been victims of sexual assault have created a support group to discuss amongst each other. 

In an interview with 10WBNS one former employee stated that during high covid times Cedar Point became lax with their hiring practices. It can be inferred that the lax hiring practices led to the workers safety being compromised and that is why there was an increase in sexual assault cases. During the pandemic Cedar Point placed pressure upon hiring staff to essentially hire whoever picked up the phone for an interview, even if it meant they had an incomplete background check. Since that accusation, Cedar Point has only chosen to publicly comment on their hiring practices and deny that they were ever 'lax' saying, "Cedar Point conducts background checks on new hire associates. It has been our longstanding practice and it continues to be a vital tool in our hiring process. If there are issues uncovered in the background check that could jeopardize the health and safety of our associates or guests, we take appropriate action up to and including termination of the associate". No official updates from Cedar Point regarding the sexual assault cases have been released since and the company's continued silence on this important issue has led to many supporters of the company thinking they are guilty.

Dorney Park & Wildwater Kingdom

Colossus*
On May 10, 1986, a park attendant on Colossus suffered injuries to his right foot after it was caught between the train and the loading platform.

Ferris Wheel
On July 11, 1940, a 9-year-old boy who was riding on the Ferris wheel fractured his skull after sticking his head out of an 8-inch opening at the top of the door which was bolted on the outside of a carriage he was sitting in. The child brought his head into contact with the framework of the wheel which then caused him to severely injure himself when his head became stuck after coming too close. He was declared dead after being taken to Allentown Hospital.

Flying Dutchman*
On July 15, 1979, six people were injured after two coaster trains collided. Two out of the six passengers were hospitalized at Allentown and Sacred Heart Hospital Center. A park spokesperson claimed that the accident occurred due to a brake malfunction on one of the trains as it rear-ended into another.
In 1986, a 13-year-old girl suffered injuries to her chest and abdomen when the ride came to a complete halt.
On August 26, 1986, one of the trains which two women were riding in collided into the other due to a computer malfunction which caused the train to not stop at its brakes near the station after completing its run. Both riders sustained injuries in the accident and were taken to the hospital.

Halloween Haunt
On January 31, 2019, a lawsuit was filed against the park when a mother claimed that her teenage daughter suffered injuries while visiting the park with her friends back in September 2017. One of the park employees dressed up as a ghost scared her by shouting loudly in her ear despite the fact that the girl did not want to be afraid. She then fell to the ground and became injured afterwards. Her mother sought over $150,000 in damages from the park and its owner for her daughter's injuries.

Hercules*
On July 18, 1993, 15 passengers were injured when two trains collided on Hercules.

Journey to the Center of the Earth*
In 1982, one of the boats stopped at the bottom of its hill as another one collided into the back of it resulting in four people suffering injuries. A lawsuit was later filed on April 25, 1984, which claimed that a park employee saw that the first boat was stopped at a dangerous location and failed to press the emergency stop button before the second boat impacted.

The Monster
On July 19, 1981, two girls narrowly avoided serious injury by deboarding the ride after one of its arms broke off and crashed to the ground. Both were taken to a nearby hospital after the accident. The ride was later repaired and put back in operation about a week later.

Scenic Railway*
On September 4, 1911, multiple passengers suffered minor injuries after two cars collided. The cars on an engine were badly damaged after its roof collapsed while going through a tunnel.

Sky Ride*
On July 1, 1988, 19 passengers were evacuated off the ride by firefighters after being stranded for an hour when a car was bounced off the cable by a rowdy guest that was on board. There were no injuries, but witnesses claimed that the guest jumped from one of the lifts to the turnaround, which may have caused the pulleys to jump its main cable. The safety mechanism in turn engaged, stopping the ride.
On August 12, 1995, 36 people were stranded on the ride in mid-air for nearly an hour after a malfunction abruptly stalled all 20 gondolas they were on.

Steel Force
On June 22, 2019, a 31-year-old man allegedly punched a 14-year-old boy after an argument while waiting in line to ride Steel Force. He was arrested by police and taken to the local county jail.

Stinger*
On May 2, 2014, two people were injured when Stinger rolled back into the station.

Thunder Creek Mountain
 On August 19, 1987, a woman suffered injuries as the log she was riding in along with her son collided when it suddenly stopped. 
 On May 16, 2004, a log vehicle was stopped at the top of the lift hill, with other logs backing up behind it. Four riders received minor injuries while trying to escape and were taken to a nearby hospital as a precaution.

Thunder Creek Raceway*
In August 1990, a man suffered back injuries while riding in a go-kart. His vehicle was struck in the rear by another go-kart traveling behind.

Thunderhawk
 On July 24, 1926, a 16-year-old girl riding Thunderhawk died from injuries she sustained after falling from a coaster train.
 On July 21, 1990, two cars collided at the bottom of the lift hill. Seventeen people checked in at local hospitals for treatment of minor injuries. Inspections did not identify a mechanical failure, blaming operator error as the cause. It reopened the following day.

Wildwater Kingdom
 In June 1989, a woman claimed that she injured her right ankle while riding on the Riptide Run water slide. There were too many people riding down the slide and she was crushed to the side of the pool.
 On June 27, 1990, a girl was injured while riding in an inner tube on the Lightning Falls water slide. She was thrown from her tube after it collided with another that was stuck in a nearby tunnel. Her face struck the bottom and lost one of her teeth and also suffered back, neck and head injuries.
 On June 16, 1994, a 14-year-old boy drowned in the wave pool. His body was found overnight by a construction worker after the park's closing. The incident occurred during a school field trip, and an investigation placed blame on six adults responsible for verifying swim capabilities of their students before releasing them in the water park. In addition, when the victim was reported as missing, an assistant principal failed to act accordingly. Dorney Park staff and lifeguards also received blame for a lackluster effort to find the missing child. In 2002, the victim's mother was awarded $10 million from Dorney Park and the New York City Department of Education after both were found negligent by a Bronx Supreme Court jury.
 On April 24, 2014, a 23-year-old worker had his foot crushed by a forklift during the construction of a new water slide complex attraction called Snake Pit. He was pulled in front of the moving forklift by a rope he was holding, which was attached to a suspended steel column. He suffered injuries to the foot and ankle, and his lower right leg was later amputated after infection set in. A lawsuit filed four years later on December 5, 2018, resulted in a $2.75 million settlement with the ride's manufacturer.

Geauga Lake

Baywatch Water Show*
 On August 17, 1996, a boat driver lost control of his allegedly mechanically failing boat during a Baywatch-themed water-ski stunt show, crashing it into the fifth row of the stadium. Seventeen people were hospitalized, and five were treated on-scene.

Big Dipper*
 On September 26, 1999, three people were injured after two trains collided on Big Dipper.

Dominator*
On May 30, 2000, a 17-year-old female park employee suffered injuries after falling  from the passenger loading area of Dominator, then known as Batman: Knight Flight. Now located at Kings Dominion (2008-Present)

Double Loop*
 On May 23, 1997, a 14-year-old girl began to have trouble breathing while on Double Loop and collapsed after the ride ended once she got off the coaster train. She was taken to Columbia Solon St. Luke's Medical Center where she was pronounced dead after arrival, having been suffering through an asthma attack. A park spokesperson claimed that the girl's death was not related to the ride itself and was deemed accidental. Double Loop was temporarily shut down for about an hour that same day, but resumed normal operation the next day after passing a safety inspection.

Hurricane Harbor*
On August 16, 2000, a 9-year-old girl was reported to be in critical condition at Cleveland MetroHealth Medical Center after nearly drowning in the Hooks Lagoon section of the waterpark. Despite being conscious when firefighters arrived at the scene as a lifeguard performed CPR on the victim, her condition worsened once she was taken to the hospital for medical treatment.

Mr. Hyde's Nasty Fall*
 On August 5, 1998, two cars collided injuring four teenagers.

Raging Wolf Bobs*
 On June 16, 2007, a train on Raging Wolf Bobs failed to climb a hill and rolled backwards. The back of a train partially derailed, but there were no injuries. The ride never reopened, as the park closed at the end of the 2007 season.

Sky Glide*
On June 21, 1978, a cable malfunctioned on the ride leaving 26 passengers stranded  in the air. All were safely removed from the ride by firefighters. The attraction reopened the next day after being fully inspected by park officials.

Villain*
 On July 2, 2000, a 44-year-old woman riding Villain was injured after being hit by other guests throwing rocks at the ride. She suffered a fractured skull and a broken nose.
On July 4, 2002, a 12-year-old girl received stitches on her forehead after being struck by an object while riding the coaster.

Kings Dominion

On April 18, 1995, five people were stabbed during a massive brawl inside the park. One victim was hospitalized and had surgery, while all of those injured were later reported to be in stable condition.
On April 12, 2003, two men were shot, one of them critically, during a parking-lot altercation shortly after the sixth-annual Black Entertainment Television College Hip-Hop fest.

Dominator
 On July 20, 2012, a 48-year-old woman was found unresponsive in a car after the train returned to the unloading station on Dominator.  She was reported to have had a "seizure-like episode" after her ride. She was taken to Memorial Regional Hospital in Mechanicsville, Virginia where she was pronounced dead. An autopsy discovered she had a brain aneurysm. The ride reopened on July 23, 2012, after passing two safety inspections.

Eiffel Tower
 On August 13, 1986, a 32-year-old man leaped to his death from a curved,  restraining barrier on the tower's observation deck. The observation deck was enclosed after the incident to prevent future occurrences.

Galaxie
On September 10, 1983, a 13-year-old boy died after being found unconscious and slumped over in his seat after riding the coaster. A local coroner ruled the child's death accidental due to suffering severe head injuries.

Intimidator 305
During a test run before park operation on July 9, 2013, one of Intimidator 305's trains became stuck near the top of the lift hill. The train was eventually brought down a week later, and the ride remained closed for more than two months. Kings Dominion later explained the closure was due to a problem with the weight distribution on the gearbox, which caused a part to warp and fail. The replacement part had to be custom-built in another country, leading to the extended closure. The ride eventually reopened on September 14, 2013.

Shockwave
 On August 23, 1999, a 20-year-old man fell from his safety restraints to his death while riding Shockwave. An investigation discovered the restraints were working properly and still secured when the train returned to the station. No lawsuit was filed.
On September 2, 1999, a 13-year-old boy claimed that he was not properly secured in his restraints as they became loose after intentionally slipping out of them when the coaster's train was going up the lift hill. He then escaped serious injury by jumping out of the train onto a nearby catwalk on the side of its tracks.

Tornado
 On July 4, 2017, a woman suffered major injuries and a concussion on the Tornado water slide after the raft she was riding in flipped over.

Twisted Timbers
 On June 10, 2018, a woman was hit in the forehead by a cellphone while riding Twisted Timbers. She was later taken to Johnston-Willis Hospital and received three stitches. Sometime later following the incident, multiple signs were put up around the entrance of the roller coaster saying that guests were forbidden from bringing cellphones on the ride.

Volcano: The Blast Coaster
 On June 23, 2006, debris went flying during a launch on Volcano: The Blast Coaster, cutting a man's leg. An investigation discovered a loose bolt had become lodged in the linear induction motor magnets used to launch the train.

White Water Canyon
 On August 7, 1990, a boat on the White Water Canyon Rapids ride flipped over, injuring three, when one boat caught up with another near the ride's midpoint. It was ruled as a "freak occurrence."

Kings Island

On August 5, 1989, a 39-year-old musician was killed in the employee parking lot when they were struck by lightning.
On July 20, 2020, a 33-year-old man allegedly stole his grandmother's vehicle and led police on a highspeed chase before crashing outside the park on Interstate 71. The man then fled the scene on foot and entered the park illegally via a service road, triggering a park-wide lockdown.

Adventure Express
On November 1, 2021, a woman filed a lawsuit against the park and its owners after she suffered serious injuries which eventually caused her to become permanently disabled from riding Adventure Express. According to the suit, she stated that the coaster was violent and rough during the time of her being on the ride two years prior in October 2019. Her attorneys alleged that the owners failed to safely maintain the ride to make sure that it was running properly within the usual standards and failed to inspect it to the Occupational Safety and Health Administration. She is currently seeking $25,000 for negligence and punitive damages in the case.

Adventure Port area
On June 9, 1991, a park employee and guest trying to help another guest who had fallen into a pond, were electrocuted by an underwater circulation pump. Investigators determined the pump lacked a ground-fault circuit breaker and fined Kings Island $23,500. Two of the three men died, including the employee.

Eiffel Tower
He had climbed a large fence onto an emergency stairwell and then into the shaft for an unknown reason. He was struck by the elevator's counterweight and became tangled in the cables, then fell when the elevator at the bottom started back up again.

Firehawk
On August 8, 2009, a 38-year-old man appeared to have trouble breathing after the train he was riding on Firehawk returned to the station. He later died from natural causes at a nearby hospital. According to the Hamilton County Coroner's Office, the victim had a pre-existing heart condition and was recovering from a severe flu and a respiratory infection at the time of his ride. The coaster reopened the following day after an inspection found the ride to be operating normally.

Flight Commander
On June 9, 1991, an intoxicated 32-year-old woman fell  from the ride and was pronounced dead at a nearby hospital. She had a blood-alcohol content of 0.30%. State investigators discovered a design flaw in the restraints that allowed limp patrons to slip out of their harness and slide to the unoccupied, adjacent seat.

Flight of Fear
On February 1, 1996, a 20-year-old male construction worker working on the roof of the Flight of Fear building fell  to the ground. He suffered two broken legs and a broken pelvis.
On June 2, 2014, smoke from an overheated electrical motor filled the attraction building. Two people were treated at the scene for smoke inhalation. Approximately 2 weeks later, an external electrical panel overheated and began smoking, but did not cause any injuries.

King Cobra
On August 8, 1984, eight people riding King Cobra were injured after the rear car suddenly stopped due to a broken wheel spindle.
On July 19, 1990, an 18-year-old park employee was severely injured and placed in intensive care after getting struck by the wheel housing of a passing car. He was standing adjacent to the track, searching for a guest's lost article.

Lion Country Safari
In April 1976, the wildlife preserve introduced 50 baboons into its Lion Country Safari attraction. On April 14, 1976, the entire troop escaped their enclosure and eluded capture, causing local concern and significant national news coverage. They roamed different areas of Warren County, Ohio, for a week until all were captured.
On July 24, 1976, a lion mauled a 20-year-old park employee to death. His body was found 15 to 20 feet from his vehicle, which was protected by iron bars, in a section of the park's 100-acre wildlife preserve where about 50 lions lived. The ranger had a history of violating park rules. Investigators believed the ranger left the vehicle to relieve himself.
On May 26, 1982, a lion attacked a 34-year-old park employee who was cleaning in the area. After climbing to a rooftop, he was rescued and taken to Bethesda North Hospital where he was treated for a punctured trachea and other cuts.

Skylab
On August 9, 1990, the ride stopped abruptly mid-ride due to an electrical shortage, slightly injuring 19 people on board. A backup electrical system was installed to prevent future occurrences.

Skyride
On April 24, 1977, a malfunction due to a storm and high winds stranded 27 people on board the gondolas,  in the air. No riders were injured, but six were taken to a local hospital for evaluation.

Sling Shot
On August 1, 2004, a park spokesperson claimed that two teenage boys suffered pain and discomfort after riding Sling Shot and were taken to a nearby hospital for evaluation. The ride closed temporarily pending an inspection.

Son of Beast
On June 24, 2000, passengers on Son of Beast had to be evacuated and led down a staircase after its electrical sensor malfunctioned, causing the train they were riding to suddenly stop on the tracks before finishing its run.
On July 9, 2006, a vertical support timber cracked, leading to two more support beam failures. This caused a slight dip in the track, creating a jarring pothole effect that injured 27 riders as they passed over. Most of the injured were released from a nearby hospital later that day, while two were kept overnight. None of the injuries were life-threatening. The ride reopened on July 4, 2007, with various changes. The loop was removed to allow for lighter trains and a smoother ride, according to park officials.
In 2007, a man with a pre-existing medical condition was taken to the hospital after riding and died the next day. There was no evidence of malfunction and the incident was deemed accidental.
On June 16, 2009, a 39-year-old woman reported a head injury after riding on May 31. After a CT scan found a damaged blood vessel, she was transferred to local hospital's intensive care unit and released the next day. The ride was closed indefinitely, while a state investigation determined it had no irregularities. The ride never reopened and was demolished in 2012.

The Bat (1993)
On July 16, 2002, a park spokesperson claimed that one of the employees left their vehicle nearby on an open path next to the coaster, which caused one of the trains to collide into it during a routine test run of The Bat, known as Top Gun at the time. There were no injuries, but the seats were severely damaged. The ride reopened two days later with only one train running.
On July 26, 2003, a 34-year-old woman suffered a heart attack while riding the coaster. She was rushed to a nearby hospital and died the following day. A preliminary autopsy report found that she had an enlarged heart pre-existing condition.
On June 24, 2022, a wheel came loose while the ride was in motion. Everyone on the ride was evacuated safely by park employees; no injuries were reported.

The Beast
In September 1985, The Beast's structure was damaged by a grass fire, and 16 people suffered minor injuries.
On October 14, 2001, twenty people were sent to the hospital after two trains collided during a rainy day.

Knott's Berry Farm

On July 9, 2021, police responded to a shooting located outside of the park. There was no active shooter when they arrived. At least two were wounded from gunfire, and three others were reportedly hospitalized for other injuries.

On July 16, 2022, police responded to numerous calls from park guests reporting gunshots from inside of the park. Upon arrival, it was determined there were no gunshots, but multiple fights had broken out across the park, causing panic. The park was closed and evacuated three hours early.

Boomerang
On June 1, 2001, the train became stuck in the cobra roll, and riders evacuated using the emergency staircase.

Butterfield Stagecoach
In November 1983, a 4-year-old boy suffered severe injuries after being run over by the stagecoach's left rear wheel. The child was visiting the park during the week of Thanksgiving. A lawsuit was filed claiming negligence of the park for its loading procedure and for failing to add a barrier that would prevent small children from walking underneath the stagecoach.
On August 20, 2003, the stagecoach lost control and crashed into a nearby fence, leaving one horse dead and another needing stitches. Two passengers and a park employee were treated at a local hospital for minor injuries.
On December 30, 2012, a stagecoach tipped and fell to its side after its left rear wheel fell off. Three of the fourteen passengers were treated at a nearby hospital for minor injuries.

Calico Mine Ride
On July 29, 2022, a train derailed while Guests were riding it. The incident took place around 3 p.m. There were no reported injuries from the incident.

Calico Railroad
On October 20, 1996, an employee was killed after being crushed between two of the ride's cars while trying to separate them.
On January 27, 2001, an employee was trapped under a locomotive and his legs were seriously injured.

Calico River Rapids
In June 1996, a 36-year-old woman fell from the ride and sustained several injuries, including a fractured rib and bruises. Although she later admitted she had stood up during the ride, she was still awarded $69,000 during a court case.

Calico Square
On August 21, 1994, a stuntman was airlifted to UCI Medical Center after being critically injured while performing a show at a certain area inside the park.

Coast Rider
On June 15, 2014, a 10-year-old boy was injured on Coast Rider when his left leg and foot wedged between one of the trains as he was exiting. The train he was riding was completely stopped in the station. He was confined to a wheelchair for nearly three months following the incident. A lawsuit was filed against the park in March 2016 for his injuries.

GhostRider
 On August 25, 1999, five people sustained injuries on GhostRider after being struck by a piece of wood while riding.

Hammerhead
On May 30, 1996, a portion of the ride's exterior was slightly damaged after a ride operator accidentally forgot to close the safety gate nearby the passenger loading area during the time when it was in operation. Nobody was injured and park officials temporarily shut down the ride the following day.

Jaguar!

MonteZOOMa: The Forbidden Fortress
 On September 1, 2001, a 20-year-old woman died from a ruptured cerebral artery a day after riding  MonteZOOMa: The Forbidden Fortress. The ride was closed for several days pending an investigation. An autopsy revealed the woman had a pre-existing condition, and state investigators concluded the ride did not contribute to her death. Her family filed a wrongful death lawsuit in 2002, but it was dismissed in 2006.

Perilous Plunge
 On September 21, 2001, a 40-year-old woman fell out of Perilous Plunge during the drop sequence and died of multiple injuries sustained from blunt force trauma. California Division of Occupational Safety and Health officials stated the woman slipped through the ride's restraint system, falling into a pool at the base of the structure. Her seat belt and lap bar were closed and locked when the boat returned to the station.

Pony Express
 On October 7, 2010, the launch system of Pony Express failed to propel a train over the first hill and rolled back into the station, colliding with another train and causing minor injuries to ten people. An investigation discovered that paint on the brake fins impaired the braking system. The investigation also revealed a lack of proper testing procedures by the park to anticipate failed launches and rollbacks.

Sky Jump
On October 30, 1983, an 18-year-old man fell  to his death after climbing over the safety rail of the gondola he was riding in during the annual Knott's Scary Farm event. The incident was the first death in Knott's history. Details surrounding the incident indicated the man may have committed suicide, and the park claimed the ride was operating normally.

Supreme Scream
On July 17, 2021, a man climbed to the top of the Supreme Scream tower, prompting the temporary closure of most of the park's attractions and surrounding streets. He stood atop the structure for an hour before safely coming down on his own. He was taken to a local hospital for evaluation before being put into police custody.

Tampico Tumbler
On July 15, 1993, a 34-year-old mentally disabled woman suffered severe head and internal injuries after falling  from the spinning gondola ride to the ground. She was hospitalized in critical condition, and an investigation determined that the woman managed to climb out of her lap bar while the ride was still in motion. Tampico Tumbler was temporarily shut down for inspection and later reopened the same evening.

Timber Mountain Log Ride
 In July 2014, a 6-year-old girl was riding Timber Mountain Log Ride with her father when her face smacked into the back of the seat in front of her position, causing a loss of consciousness and lingering vision problems. A lawsuit was filed in May 2015.
 In 2016, a 6-year-old boy became injured when he fractured his eye socket while riding. His face smacked into the back of the seat in front of his position. A lawsuit was filed in August 2017.

Xcelerator
 On September 16, 2009, a launch cable snapped on Xcelerator, lacerating a 12-year-old boy's leg and injuring his father's back.

Michigan's Adventure

Chaos
 On July 30, 2001, the upper rotating portion of the ride separated from the stationary base, leading to a sudden collapse of the passenger ride wheel. The rotation was immediately halted, and several of the passenger cars were severely damaged. 31 of 33 riders were sent to local hospitals with mostly minor injuries. The other two were removed from their vehicle nine hours after the collapse. An investigation blamed maintenance for loose bolts that twisted and broke, as well as structural fatigue fractures discovered afterward.

Shivering Timbers 

 On June 19, 2021, a train with guests was stopped by the ride's computer on the final emergency brakes set on the brake run after slipping past the first set due to persistent rain. Maintenance arrived shortly on the scene and deactivated the E-Stop. This caused the emergency brakes to disengage and released the stopped train, thus colliding with the second empty train in the station. The collision was not at high speed, and none of the guests faced severe injuries. The ride was closed afterward for two weeks to repair and reinforce the damaged track caused by the collision. The ride was later reopened on July 3, 2021, with only one train in operation.[citation needed] The ride has since gone back to having two trains in operation for the 2022 season.

Thunderhawk
On May 29, 2017, Thunderhawk's emergency safety mechanism shut down the ride for 90 minutes after a lift motor malfunctioned. One train was in the station, while another was moving on the track.

WildWater Adventure
On July 11, 2014, a cloud of chlorine gas spread in the wave pool at WildWater Adventure, exposing more than 50 guests in the area. 28 of them were taken to a local hospital for treatment, while the remaining 27 were treated on scene and released.

Zach's Zoomer
 On June 30, 2000, a 38-year-old woman turning to photograph her relatives in the cars behind her fell out of Zach's Zoomer and was critically injured. As she fell off, she was struck by a wooden support beam. Paramedics found the woman unconscious, and she was transported to Hackley Hospital in critical condition. She suffered rib fractures and other internal injuries.

Valleyfair

Adult Night
 On May 25, 2017, numerous fights broke out during Valleyfair's debut of "Adult Night", an event that only admits adults inside the park. The fighting took place mostly in the parking lot area, while a small number occurred inside the park. No serious injuries were reported. At least one guest was arrested and charged with disorderly conduct.

The Flume
 On June 28, 1994, an 11-year-old girl was injured while attempting to exit the ride. She reportedly became frightened as the boat was about to climb the  lift hill and tried to get off the boat. A second boat pinned her underwater. Park staff performed first aid on the victim before paramedics arrived, and she was taken to a nearby hospital where she was reported to be in critical condition.

London Terror
 On November 21, 2015, a fire broke out at a storage building being used for a haunt attraction at London Terror. A quarter of the structure was damaged, and the cause of the fire was undetermined. No injuries were reported.

Power Tower
 On July 21, 2017, a 41-year-old ride operator sued Power Tower's manufacturer S&S - Sansei Technologies after he was injured while performing maintenance.

Soak City
 On August 5, 2010, a chlorine leak at Soak City sent 26 people to the hospital.

ValleySCARE
 On September 22, 2018, police were forced to close the ValleySCARE event early after a large number of fights broke out. At least three people involved were cited. Police from multiple surrounding communities assisted with the park's evacuation.

Xtreme Swing
 On September 3, 2007, a fire began in an electrical junction box. The ride reopened several days following repair, and no injuries were reported.

Wild Thing
 On May 21, 2006, a mounting bracket in Wild Thing's braking system malfunctioned, damaging the rear axle of the fifth car in one of the trains, which led to the disconnection of the sixth car. It tipped over into an adjacent fence injuring 18 people, 14 of which were sent to a nearby hospital with minor injuries. The ride reopened on June 1, 2006, after passing multiple safety inspections and tests.

Worlds of Fun

On August 7, 1993, two parking lot trams collided, injuring nine people including a park employee.
On April 20, 2019, a massive brawl occurred during evening hours between groups of teenagers near the Planet Snoopy area.

Barnstormer
On June 30, 1978, during the  Barnstormer's first season of operation, a malfunction caused the spinning planes carrying riders to descend rapidly, impacting each other on the way down. Some riders were also sprayed with hydraulic fluid. Twenty riders suffered minor injuries.

Extremeroller
 On May 18, 1976, an 8-year-old boy was critically injured on Extremeroller, named Screamroller at the time, after being struck by a coaster train when he unknowingly entered a restricted area. He was taken to a nearby hospital and reported to be in serious condition. Barriers were later installed underneath the ride to prevent future occurrences. A lawsuit was filed the following year, which awarded the boy's family $1.39 million in a court settlement against Mid-America Enterprises for his injuries.

Fury of the Nile
On June 19, 1984, a 9-year-old boy became trapped in his seat belt while on Fury of the Nile after a raft struck another and overturned, breaking his leg.

Oceans of Fun
 On June 23, 2016, a 66-year-old man was arrested by police after allegedly exposing himself to a 12-year-old girl in the wave pool at Oceans of Fun and making physical contact with a 13-year-old girl. He was charged with sexual misconduct.
 On August 24, 2019, a 14-year-old boy nearly drowned in the wave pool. Lifeguards pulled the unresponsive victim out of the water, and paramedics regained his pulse after performing CPR. The boy later died at a local hospital after being removed from life support.
 On July 5, 2022, a 6-year-old girl was pulled by lifeguards from the Coconut Cove pool where she was drowning. The lifeguard performed CPR and she was later transported to Children's Mercy Hospital where she later died. The pool was closed temporarily as a response to this incident.

Orient Express
 On June 14, 1987, a train on Orient Express pulling into the loading station malfunctioned and slammed into the rear of another parked train. Of the 56 passengers, 8 were taken to a nearby hospital for minor injuries.
 On July 17, 1999, two cars of a seven-car train derailed, stranding 18 people. Eight of the riders checked into a local hospital with non-critical injuries. Severe internal metal fatigue in a support post was determined as the cause.

Timber Wolf
 On March 31, 1990, two trains on Timber Wolf collided shortly before returning to the station, injuring 35 people. The control system malfunctioned, losing control of both trains. The ride reopened operating with a single train until the control system was repaired.
 On June 30, 1995, a 14-year-old girl fell from the coaster and died. Eyewitnesses claimed to see the girl lift the restraints. The girl's family disputed the park's statement that the restraints were operating normally. The ride was temporarily closed pending an investigation of its safety features, which resulted in new lap bar installations. Park owner Hunt-Midwest and ride manufacturer Dinn Corporation settled with the family for $200,000.
 On August 2, 2014, an 11-year-old boy was taken to a nearby hospital after suffering a concussion and a bloody nose on the ride. As the train was descending a hill, he hit his head and nose on the restraints.

2012 WindSeeker incidents
During the 2012 season, all WindSeeker installations, with the exception of the Kings Island's location, experienced issues with its safety mechanism that would engage and strand riders in the air. Knott's Berry Farm experienced two occurrences, and in one of those, riders were stranded for nearly four hours. The California Occupational Safety and Health Administration ordered the closure of the ride on September 19 pending an investigation into the cause. On September 21, Cedar Fair made the decision to close all WindSeekers, pending an internal review. An evacuation system designed by the ride's manufacturer, Mondial, was installed at all Windseeker locations, beginning with Knott's Berry Farm. The system involves an employee riding in a metal cage that ascends the ride's shaft, enclosing up to four seats to safely evacuate riders.

See also
Amusement park accidents

References

Cedar Fair
 
California's Great America